The 2003 Austin mayoral election was held on May 3, 2003, to elect the mayor of Austin, Texas, USA. Will Wynn was elected.

Incumbent mayor Gustavo L. Garcia did not seek reelection.

Election results

References

2003 Texas elections
2003 United States mayoral elections
2003
Non-partisan elections